The 1900 Kansas State Aggies football team represented Kansas State Agricultural College—now known as Kansas State University—as an independent during the 1900 college football season. Led by Fay Moulton in his first and only season as head coach, the Aggies compiled a record of 2–4.

Schedule

References

Kansas State
Kansas State Wildcats football seasons
Kansas State Aggies football